Corynebacterium diphtheriae is the pathogenic bacterium that causes diphtheria. It is also known as the Klebs–Löffler bacillus, because it was discovered in 1884 by German bacteriologists Edwin Klebs (1834–1912) and Friedrich Löffler (1852–1915). The bacteria are usually harmless unless they are infected by a bacteriophage that carries a gene that gives rise to a toxin. This toxin causes the disease. Diphtheria is caused by the adhesion and infiltration of the bacteria into the mucosal layers of the body, primarily affecting the respiratory tract and the subsequent release of an endotoxin. The toxin has a localized effect on skin lesions, as well as a metastatic, proteolytic effects on other organ systems in severe infections. Originally a major cause of childhood mortality, diphtheria has been almost entirely eradicated due to the vigorous administration of the diphtheria vaccination in the 1910s.

Diphtheria is no longer transmitted as frequently due to the development of the vaccine, DTaP. Although diphtheria outbreaks continue to occur, this often in developing countries where the majority of the population is not vaccinated.

Classification
Four subspecies are recognized: C. d. mitis, C. d. intermedius, C. d. gravis, and C. d. belfanti. The four subspecies differ slightly in their colonial morphology and biochemical properties, such as the ability to metabolize certain nutrients. All may be toxigenic (and therefore cause diphtheria) or not toxigenic.

Strain subtyping involves comparing species of bacteria and categorizing them into subspecies. Strain subtyping also helps with identifying the origin of a certain bacteria's outbreak. However, when it comes to the subtyping of C. diphtheriae, there is not a lot of useful or accurate classification due to the lack of publicly available resources to identify strains and therefore finding the origin of outbreaks.

Toxin
C. diphtheriae produces diphtheria toxin which alters protein function in the host by inactivating the elongation factor EF-2. This causes pharyngitis and 'pseudomembrane' in the throat. The strains which are toxigenic are ones which have been infected with a bacteriophage.

The diphtheria toxin gene is encoded by the bacteriophage found in toxigenic strains, integrated into the bacterial chromosome.

The diphtheria toxin repressor is mainly controlled by iron. It serves as the essential cofactor for the activation of target DNA binding. A
low concentration of iron is required in the medium for toxin production. At high iron concentrations, iron molecules bind to an aporepressor on the beta bacteriophage, which carries the Tox gene.  When bound to iron, the aporepressor shuts down toxin production. Elek's test for toxigenicity is used to determine whether the organism is able to produce the diphtheria toxin.

Identification
To identify C. diphtheriae, a Gram stain is performed to show Gram-positive, highly pleomorphic organisms often looking like  Chinese letters. Stains like Albert's stain and Ponder's stain are used to demonstrate the metachromatic  granules formed in the polar regions. The granules are called polar granules, Babes Ernst granules or volutin granules. An enrichment medium, such as Löffler's medium, is used to preferentially grow C. diphtheriae. After that, a differential plate known as tellurite agar, allows all Corynebacteria (including C. diphtheriae) to reduce tellurite to metallic tellurium. The tellurite reduction is colorimetrically indicated by brown colonies for most Cornyebacterium species or by a black halo around the C. diphtheriae colonies. The organism produces catalase but not urease, which differentiates it from Corynebacterium ulcerans. C. diphtheriae does not produce pyrazinamidase which differentiates from Corynebacterium striatum and Corynebacterium jeikeium.

Pathogenicity 

Corynebacterium diphtheriae is the bacterium that causes the disease called diphtheria. Bacteriophages introduce a gene into the bacterial cells that makes a strain toxigenic. The strains that are not infected with these viruses are harmless.  C. diphtheriae is a rod-shaped, Gram-positive, nonspore-forming, and nonmotile bacterium.  C. diphtheriae has shown to exclusively infect humans. It is believed that humans may be the reservoir for this pathogen. However, there has been extremely rare cases in which C. diphtheriae has been found in animals. These infections were only toxigenic in two dogs and two horses.

The disease occurs primarily in tropical regions and developing countries. Immunocompromised individuals, poorly immunized adults, and unvaccinated children are at the greatest risk for contracting diphtheria. Mode of transmission is person-to-person contact via respiratory droplets (i.e., coughing or sneezing). Less commonly, it could also be passed by touching open sores or contaminated surfaces. During the typical course of disease, the body region most commonly affected is the upper respiratory system. A thick, gray coating accumulates in the nasopharyngeal region, making breathing  and swallowing more difficult. The disease remains contagious for at least two weeks following disappearance of symptoms, but has been known to last for up to a month.

The most common routes of entry for C. diphtheriae are the nose, tonsils, and throat. Individuals suffering from the disease may experience sore throat, weakness, fever, and swollen glands. This could cause even more dangerous symptoms such as shortness of breath. If left untreated, diphtheria toxin may enter the bloodstream, causing damage to the kidneys, nerves, and heart.  Extremely rare complications include suffocation and partial paralysis. A vaccine, DTaP, effectively prevents the disease and is mandatory in the United States for participation in public education and some professions (exceptions apply).

The first step of C. diphtheriae infection involves the toxigenic bacteria colonizing a mucosal layer. In young children, this typically occurs in the upper respiratory tract mucosa. In adults, the infection is limited mostly to the tonsillar region. Some unusual sites of infection include the heart, larynx, trachea, bronchi, and anterior areas of the mouth including the buccal mucosa, the lips, tongue, and the hard and soft palate. The bacteria have a number of virulence factors to help them localize on areas of the respiratory tract, many of which are yet to be fully understood as diphtheria does not affect many model hosts such as mice. One common virulence factor that has been studied in vitro is DIP0733, a multi-functional protein that has shown to have a role in bacterial adhesion to host cells and fibrogen-binding qualities. In experiments with mutant strains of the C. diphtheriae, adhesion and epithelial infiltration decreased significantly. The ability to bind to extracellular matrices  aids the bacteria in avoiding detection by the body's immune system.

The diphtheritic lesion is often covered by a pseudomembrane composed of fibrin, bacterial cells, and inflammatory cells. Diphtheria toxin can be proteolytically cleaved into two fragments: an N-terminal fragment A (catalytic domain), and fragment B (transmembrane and receptor binding domain). Fragment A catalyzes the NAD+ -dependent ADP-ribosylation of elongation factor 2, thereby inhibiting protein synthesis in eukaryotic cells. Fragment B binds to the cell surface receptor and facilitates the delivery of fragment A to the cytosol.

Once the bacteria have localized in one area, they start multiplying and create the inflammatory pseudomembrane. Individuals with faucial diphtheria typically have the pseudomembrane grow over the tonsil and accessory structures, uvula, soft palate, and possibly the nasopharyngeal area. In upper respiratory tract diphtheria, the pseudomembrane can grow on the pharynx, larynx, trachea, and bronchi/bronchioles. The pseudomembrane starts off white in color and then later becomes dirty-gray and tough due to the necrotic epithelium.

Psuedomembrane formation on the trachea or bronchi will decrease efficiency of airflow. Over time, the diffusion rate in the alveoli decreases due to the lower airflow and decreases the partial pressure of oxygen in the systemic circulation, which can cause cyanosis and suffocation.

Transmission
Mode of transmission is person-to-person contact via respiratory droplets (i.e., coughing or sneezing), and less commonly, by touching open sores or contaminated surfaces.

Vaccine
A vaccine, DTaP, effectively prevents the disease and is mandatory in the United States for participation in public education and some professions (exceptions apply).

The invention of the toxoid vaccine, which provides protection against Corynebacterium diphtheriae, caused a dramatic shift on the bacterium's rate of infection in the United States. Even though the vaccine was first made in the early 1800s, it did not become widely available until the early 1910s. According to the National Health and Nutrition Examination Survey (NHANES), "80 percent of persons age 12 to 19 years were immune to diphtheria" due to the wide use of the vaccine in the United States.

Diagnosis 

Diagnosis of respiratory C. diphtheriae is made based on presentation clinically, whereas non-respiratory diphtheria may not be clinically suspected therefore laboratory testing is more reliant. Culturing is the most accurate kind of testing that will confirm or deny the prevalence of diphtheria toxins. The testing is done by swabbing the possibly infected area, as well as any lesions and sores.

Treatment and prevention 

When a toxigenic strain of Corynebacterium diphtheriae infects the human body, it releases harmful toxins, especially to the throat. Antitoxins are used to prevent further harm. Antibiotics are also used to fight the infection. Typical antibiotics that are used against diphtheria involve penicillin or erythromycin. People infected with diphtheria must quarantine for at least 48 hours after being prescribed antibiotics. To confirm that the person is no longer contagious, tests are performed ensure that the bacteria have been cleared. People are then vaccinated prevent further transmission of the disease.

The wide-use of the diphtheria vaccine dramatically decreased the rate of infection and allows for primary prevention of the disease. Most people receive a 3-in-1 vaccine that consist of protection against diphtheria, tetanus and pertussis, which is commonly knowns as the DTaP or Tdap vaccine. DTaP vaccine is for children while the Tdap vaccine is known for adolescents and adults.

In the United States, the DTaP vaccine to parents of infants which typically involves a series of five shots is recommended.  These vaccines are injected through the arm or thigh and are administered when the infant is 2 months, 4 months, 6 months, 15–18 months and then 4–6 years old.

Possible side events that are associated with the diphtheria vaccine include "mild fever, fussiness, drowsiness or tenderness at the injection site". Although it is rare, the DTaP vaccine may cause an allergic reaction that causes hives or a rash to breakout within minutes of administering the vaccine.

Genetics
The genome of C. diphtheriae consists of a single circular chromosome of 2.5 Mbp, with no plasmids. Its genome shows an extreme compositional bias, being noticeably higher in G+C near the origin than at the terminus.

The Corynebacterium diphtheriae genome is a single circular chromosome that has no plasmids. These chromosomes have a high G+C content which is what contributes to their high genetic diversity. The high content of guanine and cytosine is not constant across the entire genome of the bacteria. There is a terminus of replication around the ~740kb region that causes a decrease in the G+C content. In other bacteria, it is often seen that the G+C content gets smaller near the terminus, but C. diphtheriae is a considerably strongly genome that has this occurrence. Chromosomal replication is one of the ways this happens within this genome.

Notes

References

See also 
 Cutaneous diphtheria
 Diphtheria vaccine

External links 
 CoryneRegNet—Database of Corynebacterial Transcription Factors and Regulatory Networks''
 Corynebacterium diphtheriae genome
 Type strain of Corynebacterium diphtheriae at BacDive -  the Bacterial Diversity Metadatabase

Corynebacterium
Gram-positive bacteria
Diphtheria
Bacteria described in 1886
1884 in biology